Adria International Raceway was a motorsport race track near Adria in the Veneto region of Northern Italy. It was a permanent road course, the venue has hosted the FIA GT Championship, Italian Formula Three, Deutsche Tourenwagen Masters and the Formula Three Euroseries. In March 2022, the circuit was closed due to its debts.

Use in simulations / games 

The 2004 video game TOCA Race Driver 2, includes the circuit in the DTM section of the game. It was also used in the 2009 game Superstars V8 Racing.

Lap records 

The official race lap records at the Adria International Raceway are listed as:

References

External links 

 Adria International Raceway
 Accommodation

Sports venues in Italy
Defunct motorsport venues in Italy
2002 establishments in Italy
2022 disestablishments in Italy
World Touring Car Championship circuits